The 2016–17 Tulane Green Wave men's basketball team represented Tulane University during the 2016–17 NCAA Division I men's basketball season. The Green Wave, led by first-year head coach Mike Dunleavy Sr., played their home games at Devlin Fieldhouse in New Orleans, Louisiana as third-year members of the American Athletic Conference. They finished the season 6–25, 3–15 in AAC play to finish in tenth place. They lost in the first round of the AAC tournament to Tulsa.

Previous season 
The Green Wave finished the season 12–22, 3–15 in American Athletic play to finish in last place. They defeated UCF and Houston in the American Athletic tournament to advance to the semifinals where they lost to Memphis.

Following the season, Tulane fired head coach Ed Conroy. On March 25, 2016, the school hired Mike Dunleavy Sr. as head coach.

Departures

Incoming Transfers

Incoming recruits

Roster

Schedule and results

|-
!colspan=9 style=|  Exhibition

|-
!colspan=9 style=|  Non-conference regular season

|-
!colspan=6 style=| AAC regular season

|-
!colspan=9 style=| AAC tournament

References

Tulane Green Wave men's basketball seasons
Tulane
Tulane
Tulane